Charles-Marie Denys, comte de Damrémont (8 February 1783–12 October 1837) was a French general and military governor of French Algeria. He was killed in combat during the siege of Constantine.

Early life
Charles-Marie Denys was born in Chaumont, Haute-Marne on 8 February 1783.

His father was Antoine Denys de Damrémont (1730-1807) who belonged to a family of merchants from Bologna and who got rich in forges in the 17th century.

Military training
He entered the military school at Fontainebleau in 1803.

After graduating from the school on 1804 he became a lieutenant in the 12th regiment of chasseurs à cheval.

Europe campaigns
He took part in the Wars of the Third and Fourth Coalitions. In 1807 he became aide-de-camp to general Defrance and afterwards to Marshal Marmont.

In 1811 and 1812 Damrémont served in the Peninsular War but in 1813 he transferred to the Grande Armée with which he fought in the campaigns in Germany (1813) and France (1814).

During the Hundred Days Damrémont became a colonel.

On 25 April 1821 Damrémont was promoted to Maréchal de camp.

In 1823 he was given command of a unit in the 5th Corps in the Army of the Pyrenees, which took part in the French invasion of Spain.

From 1823 to 1829 he served as inspector of the infantry and was named as a member of various military commissions.

Conquest of Algeria

In 1830 he commanded an infantry brigade in the French invasion of Algeria. On 13 December 1830 Damrémont was promoted to lieutenant-general.

Back to France
After his participation with the troupes coloniales at the start of the French conquest of Algeria, Damrémont returned to France where he was given command of the 8th military division in Marseille on 6 February 1832.

On 15 September 1835 he was named Pair de France.

Governor of Algeria

On 12 February 1837 Damrémont was appointed governor-general of French Algeria.

He was appointed to this strategic post after General Bertrand Clauzel (1772–1842) failed in 1836 during the First Battle of Constantine.

Damrémont was to resume the attempt to besiege and submit this city in the impregnable Constantine until then.

Governor Charles-Marie Denys had in his new mission to gather human reinforcements and adequate resources in order to succeed in the conquest of the Constantinois region.

The alliance between Ahmed Bey (1786-1851) in the Constantinois with the Emir Abdelkader (1808–1883) in Orania was a stake and a squirrel that General Damrémont had to overcome in order to establish the French colonial power over the entire Algerian territory.

Mitidja

General Damrémont spent the first half of 1837 in partial engagements with rebels affiliated with Emir Mustapha (1814–1863) in the Algerian Sahel and Mitidja.

Indeed, the Emir Mustapha organized from his stronghold of Médéa in the Titteri massif, guerrilla attacks against the French camps in Mitidja and harassed the villagers who came to collaborate with the colonial authorities.

This conflicting situation at the gates of the Casbah of Algiers caused worry and hassle in Damrémont which could not quickly organize decisive expeditions and military campaigns outside the Mitidja.

He took advantage of the presence of General Thomas Robert Bugeaud (1784–1849) in Algeria to send him to Orania to attack the capital of the Emirate of Abdelkader in order to open up the region of Algérois and to devote himself to preparing the ultimate expedition against Constantine.

But Damrémont's military strategy saw before it the Khachna and Djurdjura mountains where the Kabyle tribes and the marabouts of the zawiyas of the Rahmaniyya Sufi brotherhood could compromise and defeat the next campaign towards Constantine.

This is how took place on 8 May 1837 the attack on Reghaïa in Mitidja against a colonial farm of 3000 hectares in area by the Kabyles of Beni Aïcha, Issers and Amraoua.

General Damrémont took advantage of the disarray which settled in Algiers among the French, the day after the raid on Reghaïa, to organize a punitive expedition to pacify the eastern region of Mitidja which borders the Kabylia of rebels subservient to the Emir Mustapha and the marabouts.

Kabylia

Governor Damrémont decided in the aftermath of the Mitidja troubles in 1837 to hold General Alexandre Charles Perrégaux (1791-1837) responsible for the mission to subdue the coastal town of Dellys from where the Amraoua Kabyles left to devastate the French agricultural concessions in the Mitidja.

Instructions were given to General Perrégaux to divide the troupes coloniales involved in this punitive expedition against the Kabyles into two distinct military columns.

The first maritime column was to be commanded by Perregaux himself, and was going to embark on 17 May 1837 on ships from the port of Algiers in order to land on the shore of Oued Isser then move forward to disembark in the port of Dellys.

The second pedestrian column of infantry and cavalry, which was to be commanded by Colonel Maximilien Joseph Schauenburg (1784-1838), would also begin a sustained march on 17 May 1837 from Boudouaou to reach the Col des Beni Aïcha to meet the naval forces disembarked from Perrégaux in the Issers valley in order to continue the expedition to the Amraoua dens around the Casbah of Dellys.

Constantinois

In October 1837 Damrémont commanded an expedition against Constantine.

During the siege Damrémont was hit in the head by a bullet and mortally wounded during the evening of 12 October.

He was replaced by general Valée who continued the attack and proceeded to capture the city on the 13th.

Burial
Damrémont was buried in a ceremony at Les Invalides, which also saw the premiere of Hector Berlioz's Requiem.

Awards
Charles-Marie Denys de Damrémont was decorated with several medals during his military career, including:
 Officer of the Legion of Honour, decorated with this medal since 15 September 1827.

Family
Damrémont married Clémentine Baraguey d'Hilliers (25 October 1800–4 February 1892), the daughter of General Louis Baraguey d'Hilliers, on 7 February 1819. The couple had two children:

 Auguste-Louis-Charles, born 11 December 1819 in Paris and died in 1884.
 Henriette-Françoise-Clémentine, born 11 March 1824 also in Paris and died in 1898.

Gallery

See also

 French conquest of Algeria
 Bertrand Clauzel
 Emirate of Abdelkader
 Emir Abdelkader
 Emir Mustapha
 Ahmed Bey ben Mohamed Chérif
 First Raid on Reghaïa (1837)
 Expedition of the Col des Beni Aïcha (1837)
 First Battle of Boudouaou (1837)
 First Battle of the Issers (1837)
 Siege of Constantine (1837)
 Alexandre Charles Perrégaux
 Maximilien Joseph Schauenburg
 Antoine de La Torré
 Mitidja
 Khachna
 Kabylia
 List of works by James Pradier

References

Sources

Further reading
 

1783 births
People from Chaumont, Haute-Marne
1837 deaths
Deaths in Algeria
Deaths by firearm in Algeria
Counts of France
Members of the Chamber of Peers of the July Monarchy
French generals
French colonial governors and administrators
French military personnel of the Napoleonic Wars
People of the Peninsular War
Governors general of Algeria
19th-century French military personnel
French military personnel killed in action